Rita Savagnone (born September 19, 1939) is an Italian film, television and voice actress.

Biography
Born in Rome to Giuseppe Savagnone and Rosella Marraffa and the younger sister of voice actress Deddi Savagnone, She began her acting career at some point during the 1950s. Savagnone is better known the Italian public as a voice actress. She is the official Italian voice of Vanessa Redgrave, Edwige Fenech and Joan Collins. Other actresses she dubs includes Whoopi Goldberg, Shirley MacLaine, Debbie Reynolds, Liza Minnelli, Farrah Fawcett and more. In Savagnone's animated roles, she voiced Shenzi in the Italian version of The Lion King.

As an actress, Savagnone appeared in over seven films and eight television shows. Her latest film appearance The Move of The Penguin was directed by her son Claudio Amendola.

Personal life
Savagnone was married to voice actor Ferruccio Amendola until 1971. They had two children including actor Claudio Amendola. She was also married to playwright Manlio Santanelli but that marriage also ended in divorce.

Filmography

Cinema
Sistemo l'America e torno (1974)
Chi dice donna dice donna (1976)
Nenè (1977)
Big Deal After 20 Years (1985)
Corruption (1986)
The Escort (1993)
The Move of The Penguin (2014)

References

External links

1939 births
Living people
Actresses from Rome
Italian film actresses
Italian television actresses
Italian voice actresses
Italian voice directors
20th-century Italian actresses
21st-century Italian actresses